Mohammad Hashim Zare is the current governor of Samangan, Afghanistan. Before this he had been an adviser to President Hamid Karzai. He is an ethnic Uzbek.

Ferouza Quraishi, the deputy of the Provincial Council of Jowzjan, has accused Zare of wasting foreign aid. She called the governor "inefficient" and said aid from Turkmenistan had not reached those in need and had been wasted by the governor.
According to Zare these accusations are "baseless".

Notes

Governors of Jowzjan Province
Governors of Samangan Province
Living people
Afghan Uzbek politicians
1953 births